Tariq Ali Khan (born 9 November 1951) is a former Indian film actor known for his works in Hindi cinema. He appeared in 16 films, including Yaadon Ki Baaraat (1973), Zakhmee (1975), and Hum Kisise Kum Naheen (1977).

Personal life
Khan was born in Lucknow, Uttar Pradesh, India on 9 November 1951 to Azhar Ali Khan who married Anize Khan, the sister of Nasir Hussain. He is the cousin of actors Aamir Khan and Faisal Khan. His son works in production.

Filmography

List of films 

Mera Damad (1995)
Zevar (1987)
Paise Ke Peechhey (1986)
Baat Ban Jaye (1986)
Zabardast (1985)
Manzil Manzil (1984)
Bhool (1984)
Pasand Apni Apni (1983)
Bismillah Ki Barkat (1983)
Shaukeen (1982)
Khawaja Ki Diwani (1981)
Zamaane Ko Dikhana Hai (1981)
Aap Se Pyar Hua (1978)
Hum Kisise Kum Naheen (1977)
Zakhmee (1975)
Yaadon Ki Baaraat (1973)

Awards and nominations

25th Filmfare Awards 

 Nominated - Best Supporting Actor for Hum Kisise Kum Naheen

References 

Indian male film actors
Living people
Male actors in Hindi cinema
Male actors from Mumbai
20th-century Indian male actors
1951 births